Margaret Davies is an Australian herpetologist born on 8 November 1944. She worked at the University of Adelaide studying Australian frogs, retiring in 2002. Initially appointed to a teaching post at the university, she was inspired to research frog taxonomy and their ecology from the 1970s. She identified over 30 new species of frogs during her career. She has contributed to over 120 publications.

Education
In 1966 Davies graduated with a bachelor's degree from University of Tasmania and then gained a master's degree from Australian National University in Canberra. Her doctorate was awarded by University of Adelaide for work on the genus Uperoleia.

Awards and honours
In 1996 she received the Dean’s Certificate for Excellence in Teaching in the discipline of zoology from the University of Adelaide.

She is an Honorary Fellow Royal Society of South Australia (serving on its council for 26 years) and was given Life membership of the Australian Society of Herpetologists for her service and contributions.

In 2014 she was awarded the Order of Australia for services to science in the field of herpetology.

In 2015 she was made a member of the Tasmanian Honour Roll of Women.

The species Davies' toadlet (Uperoleia daviesae Young, Tyler & Kent, 2005) was named to honour her because her scientific publications have substantially expanded knowledge of the genus Uperoleia.

Litoria daviesae Mahony, Knowles, Foster & Donnellan, 2001 was also named after her.

Species described
Cophixalus zweifeli
Crinia bilingua
Crinia nimbus
Cyclorana vagitus
Limnodynastes lignarius
Litoria cavernicola
Litoria exophthalmia
Litoria longirostris
Litoria lorica
Litoria pallida
Litoria personata
Litoria piperata
Litoria splendida Magnificent Tree Frog
Litoria umbonata
Litoria xanthomera
Mixophyes hihihorlo
Neobatrachus aquilonius
Rheobatrachus vitellinus
Uperoleia altissima
Uperoleia arenicola
Uperoleia aspera
Uperoleia borealis
Uperoleia capitulata
Uperoleia crassa
Uperoleia fusca
Uperoleia glandulosa
Uperoleia inundata
Uperoleia lithomoda
Uperoleia littlejohni
Uperoleia martini
Uperoleia micromeles
Uperoleia mimula
Uperoleia minima
Uperoleia talpa
Uperoleia trachyderma
Uperoleia tyleri

Personal life
Davies is the great-great-granddaughter of John Davies, who co-founded The Mercury.

References

Members of the Order of Australia
Australian herpetologists
Women herpetologists
Living people
1944 births
University of Tasmania alumni
Australian National University alumni
University of Adelaide alumni
Academic staff of the University of Adelaide
20th-century Australian zoologists
20th-century Australian women scientists
21st-century Australian zoologists
21st-century Australian women scientists